Marylise Lévesque (born March 3, 1983 in Quebec, Canada) is a Canadian judoka. She competed at the 2008 Summer Olympics in the 78kg category and lost to Pürevjargalyn Lkhamdegd in the repechage. Lévesque won the bronze at the 2007 Pan American Games.

See also 

 Judo in Quebec
 Judo in Canada
 List of Canadian judoka

References

External links
Marylise Lévesque at JudoInside.com

See also
Judo in Canada

1983 births
Living people
Canadian female judoka
Judoka at the 2007 Pan American Games
Judoka at the 2008 Summer Olympics
Olympic judoka of Canada
Pan American Games bronze medalists for Canada
Pan American Games medalists in judo
Universiade medalists in judo
Universiade bronze medalists for Canada
Medalists at the 2007 Summer Universiade
Medalists at the 2007 Pan American Games
20th-century Canadian women
21st-century Canadian women